The Virgin Islands competed at the 2022 World Games in Birmingham, United States, from July 7 to 17, 2022. Athletes representing Virgin Islands won three silver medals and one bronze medal. The country finished in 54th place in the medal table.

Medalists

Competitors

Powerlifting

Virgin Islands has qualified four men and four women.

References 

Nations at the 2022 World Games
United States Virgin Islands at multi-sport events
2022 in United States Virgin Islands sports